Glenn Gorman (born 26 January 1976) is a former Australian rules footballer who played with North Melbourne in the Australian Football League (AFL).

Gorman was selected with one of three top five picks that the Sydney Swans had at their disposal in the 1993 AFL draft, but wouldn't play a senior AFL game for the club. The former Geelong Falcon then made his way to North Melbourne through the 1995 Pre-season Draft and was a member of their 1995 and 1996 reserves premiership teams. He made only two appearances in the seniors, both in the 1996 AFL season, which ended with North Melbourne winning the flag. His first game came in North Melbourne's 113-point win over Melbourne on the MCG, remembered for Wayne Carey kicking a career best 11 goals. He appeared again three weeks later, in round 20, against Adelaide at Football Park.

He has since played and coached in Canberra, starting at Ainslie in 1997.

Gorman is the current coach of the Tuggeranong Hawks Football Club.

References

1976 births
Australian rules footballers from Victoria (Australia)
North Melbourne Football Club players
Geelong Falcons players
Living people